During the 1912–13 season Hibernian, a football club based in Edinburgh, finished joint sixth out of 18 clubs in the Scottish First Division along with Motherwell and Aberdeen.

Scottish First Division

Final League table

Inter City Midweek League

Scottish Cup

See also
List of Hibernian F.C. seasons

References

External links
Hibernian 1912/1913 results and fixtures, Soccerbase

Hibernian F.C. seasons
Hibernian